Neethibathi is a 1983 Indian Tamil-language legal drama film directed by  R. Krishnamoorthy and produced by Suresh Balaji. The film stars Sivaji Ganesan and K. R. Vijaya. It is a remake of the 1982 Telugu film Justice Chowdary.

Plot 
Rajasekar is a skilled prosecutor with a wife named Radha, a police inspector son named Shankar, and a mute daughter named Geetha. Sattanathan is a defense attorney and a bitter professional rival of Rajasekar. He offers advice and guidance to Kalidas, the leader of a diamond smuggling gang. Rajasekar had earlier successfully argued for Kalidas's twin brother Ranjith to be hanged for his crimes, which had created animosity between them. Despite this, Rajasekar is appointed as a judge, bypassing Sattanathan. As a judge, Rajasekar sentences Kalidas's other brother Jagan to life imprisonment. This event triggers Sattanathan and Kalidas to plan to bring Rajasekar down.

Thyagu is a mechanic and car racer who is determined to build a large house for his imprisoned mother, Janaki. Janaki was a single mother who took the blame for a murder Thyagu committed as a child trying to protect her. Thyagu begins to work for Kalidas by driving getaway vehicles. He also falls in love with Devi, Sattanathan's daughter. When Devi learns of Thyagu's criminal activities, she convinces him to give up crime and start anew. However, just as he is ready to walk away from crime, Thyagu learns that his father, whom he believes abandoned Janaki, is none other than Rajasekar. This discovery enrages him, and he teams up with Kalidas and Sattanathan to destroy Rajasekar. Together, they plot to make Geetha's husband abandon her and have Shankar arrested on false charges. Meanwhile, Janaki is released from prison, and Rajasekar learns about the conspirators against him. He must now uncover deeply buried truths about his family and outsmart those against him.

Cast 
 Sivaji Ganesan as Justice Rajasekar
 K. R. Vijaya as Radha
 Sujatha as Janaki
 V. K. Ramasamy as Lawyer Sattanathan
 Manorama as Arogyamary a. k. a Lucy
 Raadhika as Devi
 Prabhu as Thyagu
 R. N. Sudarshan as Kalidas and Ranjith
 Menaka as Geetha
 Sathyakala as Uma
 Vijayakumar as Ramesh (Guest Role)
 Ceylon Manohar as Mano
 Y. G. Mahendra as Anthony
 V. Gopalakrishnan as Boopathy
 Poornam Viswanathan as Radha's father
 Natarajan Ramji as Raja's Son
 Silk Smitha dancer in the Muthedukkum Aasaiyile song

Soundtrack 
The soundtrack was composed by Gangai Amaran.

Reception 
Ananda Vikatan called it yet another Ganesan film to be watched, enjoyed and disliked.

References

External links 
 

1980s Tamil-language films
1983 films
Indian legal drama films
Tamil remakes of Telugu films
Films directed by R. Krishnamoorthy